The 1989 Embassy World Darts Championship was the 12th World Professional Championships, and was staged at the Lakeside Country Club, Frimley Green, Surrey, England for the fourth successive year. The tournament was organised by the British Darts Organisation (BDO).

Following the 1988 Winmau World Masters ITV pulled all their coverage of darts and the BBC decided to withdraw their coverage of the 1988 British Professional Championship, meaning that this World Championship was the only televised darts tournament in 1989. The World Championship would remain the only annual televised event for the next four years.

In an attempt to improve the image of the game (which contributed to the loss of television coverage and sponsors), the BDO decided that players would no longer be allowed to drink alcohol during matches - allowing just water on the stage.

The tournament itself saw old rivals Jocky Wilson and Eric Bristow meet in the final after Wilson had beaten defending champion Bob Anderson and Bristow had seen off John Lowe in the semi-finals. Wilson raced into a five sets to nil lead, but Bristow took the next four sets to set up a tense finish - until, after missing several double attempts, Wilson finally took the title 6–4.

Seeds
  Bob Anderson
  John Lowe
  Eric Bristow
  Mike Gregory
  Jocky Wilson
  Peter Evison
  Russell Stewart
  Dave Whitcombe

Prize money
The prize fund was £84,800.

Champion: £20,000
Runner-Up: £10,000
Semi-Finalists (2): £5,000
Quarter-Finalists (4): £2,600
Last 16 (8): £1,900
Last 32 (16): £1,200

There was also a 9 Dart Checkout prize of £52,000, along with a High Checkout prize of £1,000.

The results

References

BDO World Darts Championships
Bdo World Darts Championship, 1989
Bdo World Darts Championship